American country singer Reba McEntire has appeared in 55 music videos and has released 9 video albums.

Music videos

Video albums

References 

Videographies of American artists
Videography